"Sunsets" is a song released as the third single from Australian rock band Powderfinger's fifth studio album, Vulture Street. The single was released on 4 January 2004 in Australia and New Zealand. "Sunsets" earned a mixed response from reviewers. Some reviewers praised its appeal and aggression, whilst others appreciated the power ballad elements within it. Others, however, described the song negatively as "lumbering". "Sunsets" charted moderately, reaching  11 on the Australian Singles Chart.

Recording and production 

Vulture Street was recorded and developed over a seven-week period in Sydney, Australia. It was during this time that "Sunsets" was written and produced. Nick DiDia produced the album, as he had done on previous Powderfinger albums including Odyssey Number Five. "Sunsets" was mixed in Atlanta, Georgia, by Brendan OBrien, who had previously worked with DiDia. Fanning described the album during production stages as "a much more dry, direct rock", but also noted that "just because I rock, doesn't mean I'm made of stone". In that sense, "Sunsets" (and numerous other songs on Vulture Street) were seen as emotive, combined with the rock elements Fanning described.

In an interview with Undercover magazine, Powderfinger guitarist Darren Middleton described "Sunsets" as one of (songwriter and lead vocalist) Bernard Fanning's older songs. He said it was similar to the acoustic songs on Odyssey Number Five, the band's previous album. Middleton also said the band worked hard to make "Sunsets" heavy, so that it shared the feel of other songs on the album. In an interview with Rove host Rove McManus, Fanning described Vulture Street as the band wanting to "make a change" and "go back to why [they] started playing". He cited rock and roll from the 1970s as a major influence on the album, especially the work of Led Zeppelin and AC/DC.

Response 
"Sunsets" was received with varying levels of enthusiasm from reviewers. MusicOMH reviewer Simon Evans described "Sunsets" and "Stumblin'" as some of the more "lumbering" moments on Vulture Street, but still said they contained "a certain earthy appeal". In his review of Vulture Street, Sputnikmusic contributor James Bishop agreed, calling "Sunsets" the "most successful single from the album", and praising its emotional impact.

Meanwhile, Allmusic's Vulture Street reviewer, Jason MacNeil, described "Sunsets" as "adorable", and drew comparisons to The Verve's "Lucky Man". Sydney Morning Herald's Bernard Zuel agreed, praising "Sunsets" as "the new definition of power ballad", and saying the song contained "open-hearted feeling and well-constructed progression".

Music video 
The music video for "Sunsets" was created by the animation studio Liquid Animation. It begins with the following dialogue in yellow:

The visual theme for the video is the Chinese legend of Houyi. The video goes on to introduce King Di-Jun, his ten sons (who are also the Celestial Suns), Queen Xi and Warrior Yi. The video shows one of the King's ten sons being strapped to the back of the jade dragon, but breaks free and the sons made life on Earth unbearable, so the King send the warrior who was introduced earlier to kill them. He succeeds in finding them, and kills all but one.

An acoustic video for "Sunsets" is also featured on bonus DVDs for Vulture Street, and Dream Days at the Hotel Existence, as well as the Sunsets DVD single and These Days: Live in Concert "low key" DVD. The video features Bernard Fanning and Darren Middleton playing the song in a rehearsal room.

Accolades

Track listing 
 "Sunsets"
 "Sunsets" (acoustic)
 "Rita" (Audio Airlock demos)
 "Not the Only One" (studio outtake)

Personnel 

Powderfinger
Bernard Fanning — Guitar and vocals
John Collins — Bass guitar
Ian Haug — Guitars
Darren Middleton — Guitars
Jon Coghill — Drums

Additional musicians
 Tony Reyes – Keyboards, guitar and backing vocals
 Shauna Jensen and Maggie McKinney – Backing vocals
 Lachlan Doley – Hammond organ and piano
 Nick DiDia – Tambourine and anüsaphone

Production
 Nick DiDia – Producer, engineer
 Tony Reyes – Producer
 Brendan O'Brien – Mixer
 Anton Hagop – Additional engineer
 Catherine Claire – Assistant engineer
 Paul Piticco, Brian Quinn, Annette Perkins, Janne Scott and Jean Reid – Managers
 Steven Gorrow – Art and direction
 Christopher Morris – Photographer

Charts

See also 

 Powderfinger songs
 Full discography

References 

Powderfinger songs
2003 songs
2004 singles

Polydor Records singles
Songs written by Bernard Fanning
Songs written by Darren Middleton
Songs written by Ian Haug
Songs written by John Collins (Australian musician)
Songs written by Jon Coghill
Universal Records singles